Henry Donnelly Rhodes (December 4, 1937 – January 8, 2018) was a Canadian actor, known professionally as Donnelly Rhodes. He had many American television and film credits, probably best known to American audiences as the hapless escaped convict Dutch Leitner on the soap opera spoof Soap and as Phillip Chancellor II on The Young and the Restless. Rhodes was well-known to Canadian audiences as Sgt. Nick Raitt in the CBC TV series Sidestreet (1975–1978) and as Grant "Doc" Roberts in another CBC TV series, Danger Bay (1984–1990). He also starred as Doctor Cottle ("Doc") on Battlestar Galactica (2004–2009).

Life and career
Rhodes was born in 1937, although some sources say 1936, and raised in Winnipeg, Manitoba. He was a graduate of the National Theatre School of Canada. 

A large portion of Rhodes' career consists of guest-starring roles in American television. He appeared twice on Laredo: in 1965, he played Bob Jamison in Rendezvous at Arillo and played a lead role in "The Trap", an episode on The Alfred Hitchcock Hour. The next year, Rhodes was cast in The Would-Be Gentleman of Laredo as Don Carlos.

In 1966, Rhodes appeared as Red Eagle in the episode "Pariah" of the Universal Television series The Road West. The same year, he guest-starred on Dundee and the Culhane. He appeared in three episodes of the original Mission: Impossible (1966-1973 TV series), in the Season 3 episode, "The Freeze" (1968), in the Season 4 episode, "Mastermind" (1969), and in the Season 7 episode, "Ultimatum" (1972). He also played the main card player, Macon, who threatens the Sundance Kid (Robert Redford) in the opening scene of Butch Cassidy and the Sundance Kid (1969).

In 1973, Rhodes co-starred in an episode of the sci-fi drama The Starlost (episode 12, 'The Implant People'). He played Phillip Chancellor II in The Young and the Restless from 1974 to 1975, and from 1978 to 1981, he played escaped convict Dutch Leitner on Soap.

In 1980, Rhodes played a priest in the miniseries The Chisholms. In 1982, he played Leo, a bar patron on Cheers. In 1983 he appeared as Wilson Arthur MacLeish on Magnum P.I. on the episode "Of Sound Mind". In 1984, he had a supporting role as the beleaguered father in the short-lived TV series Double Trouble and appeared as Arland D. Williams Jr. in the television movie Flight 90: Disaster on the Potomac. From 1985 to 1990, he played Dr. Grant Roberts in the series Danger Bay. In 1987, he made a guest appearance on The Golden Girls as Jake Smollens, a handsome, rough-around-the-edges caterer.

In 1988, Rhodes guest-starred on Empty Nest as Leonard, an old friend of the main character. In 1991 he played the "Prodigal Father" in an episode of Murder, She Wrote. He starred as ruthless corporate lawyer R.J. Williams during the 1991-92 season of the drama Street Legal. In 1993, Rhodes played Jim Parker in "Shapes" (Season 1, episode 19) of The X-Files. 

For seven years (1998-2005), he played the role of Detective Leo Shannon on the acclaimed CBC television series, Da Vinci's Inquest. 

Rhodes played the character Milash in an episode of Smallville in 2008. On the revived Battlestar Galactica (2004–2009), Rhodes played Chief Medical Officer Sherman Cottle who smoked cigarettes in most scenes. Most recently Rhodes played Mr. Decker, Rufus Decker's father, in the two seasons of The Romeo Section on CBC in 2015-2016.

Rhodes' film appearances were fewer, including roles in Gunfight in Abilene (1967), Butch Cassidy and the Sundance Kid (1969), Change of Mind (1969), The Neptune Factor (1973), Goldenrod (1976), Oh! Heavenly Dog (1980), Urban Safari (1995), and Tron: Legacy (2010).

In February 2009, the Union of British Columbia Performers honoured Rhodes with the Sam Payne Award for Lifetime Achievement.

Radio work
Rhodes provided the voice of the US president at the start of each episode of the CBC Radio One space opera/comedy series Canadia: 2056.

Death
Rhodes died of cancer at the Baillie House Hospice in Maple Ridge, British Columbia at the age of 80.

Filmography

Film

Television

References

External links
 
 

1937 births
2018 deaths
Canadian male film actors
Canadian male television actors
Deaths from cancer in British Columbia
National Theatre School of Canada alumni
Male actors from Winnipeg
Best Actor in a Drama Series Canadian Screen Award winners
20th-century Canadian male actors
21st-century Canadian male actors